is a railway station in the town of Mori, Shizuoka Prefecture, Japan, operated by the third sector Tenryū Hamanako Railroad.

Lines
Enshū-Mori Station is served by the Tenryū Hamanako Line, and is located 12.8 kilometers from the starting point of the line at Kakegawa Station.

Station layout
The station has a side platform and an island platform serving three tracks, connected to an old wooden station building by a level crossing. The station is staffed. The station building and platform, which were built in 1935 were designated a Registered Tangible Cultural Property in 2011.

Adjacent stations

|-
!colspan=5|Tenryū Hamanako Railroad

Station History
Enshū-Mori Station was established on April 17, 1935, the terminal station on the Japan National Railway Futamata line, until the extension of the line to Kanasashi Station on June 1, 1940. Freight services were discontinued in 1970. After the privatization of JNR on March 15, 1987, the station came under the control of the Tenryū Hamanako Line.

Passenger statistics
In fiscal 2016, the station was used by an average of 362 passengers daily (boarding passengers only).

Surrounding area
 Mori town hall

See also
 List of Railway Stations in Japan

References

External links

   Tenryū Hamanako Railroad Station information 
 

Railway stations in Shizuoka Prefecture
Railway stations in Japan opened in 1935
Stations of Tenryū Hamanako Railroad
Mori, Shizuoka